The Pakistani national cricket team toured Bangladesh in January 2002 and played a two-match Test series against the Bangladeshi national cricket team. Pakistan won the Test series 2–0. In addition, the teams played a three-match series of Limited Overs Internationals (LOI) which Pakistan won 3–0. Pakistan were captained by Waqar Younis and Bangladesh by Khaled Mashud.

Test series summary

1st Test

2nd Test

One Day Internationals (ODIs)

1st ODI

2nd ODI

3rd ODI

References

2002 in Pakistani cricket
2002 in Bangladeshi cricket
Pakistani cricket tours of Bangladesh
International cricket competitions in 2001–02
Bangladeshi cricket seasons from 2000–01